is a Japanese monthly manga magazine published by Shogakukan; established on May 15, 1977. Its main target is elementary school-aged boys. Several of its properties, like Doraemon and the Pokémon series of games, have gone on to be cultural phenomena in Japan.

The name comes from a phenomime  which means "rolling" and also represents something spherical, fat, or small, because children supposedly like such things. The magazine is A5-sized, about 6 cm ( in) thick, and each issue is 750 pages long. CoroCoro Comic is released monthly with new issues on the 15th of each month (or earlier if the 15th falls on a weekend). CoroCoro Comic sold 400million copies as of April 2017, making it one of the best-selling comic/manga magazines.

The magazine has three sisters: Bessatsu CoroCoro Comic (別冊コロコロコミック), CoroCoro Ichiban! (コロコロイチバン) and CoroCoro Aniki (コロコロアニキ). Bessatsu and Ichiban! are published bi-monthly, while Aniki, which targeted an older audience, was released quarterly. On November 20, 2020, CoroCoro Comic cover designer Tariji Sasaki was recognized by Guinness World Records as the longest-running cover designer for a children's magazine. CoroCoro Aniki ended publication in March 2021.

History
The magazine was launched in 1977 as a magazine for Doraemon, which is one of the most popular manga in Japan. Before then Doraemon had been serialized in 6 Shogakukan magazines, targeted to students of 6 elementary school grades, that target audience has now increased. It collected stories of Doraemon from these magazines. It celebrated its 30th anniversary in 2007 with an exhibition at the Kyoto International Manga Museum.

Tie-ins
CoroCoro regularly promotes toys and video games related to their manga franchises, releasing stories and articles featuring them. Pocket Monsters/Pokémon's big success in Japan owes to this in a way; the Game Boy game Pocket Monsters Blue was sold exclusively through the magazine at first, which helped CoroCoro'''s sales as well. CoroCoro is also often a source of information about upcoming Pokémon games and movies.

Other successful tie-ins include:
Radio controlled car, Mini 4WD (with Tamiya)
Famicom, Super Famicom, and Game Boy line (with Nintendo and third parties)
Beyblade, B-Daman (with Takara)
Bikkuriman (with Lotte)
Barcode Battler (with Epoch Co.)

 Manga series currently being serialized 

 Manga titles currently serialized in Monthly CoroCoro Comic Super Mario-kun (Since November 1990)Pocket Monsters / Pocket Monsters SPECIAL (Since April 1996)CoroCoro Manga College (Since February 2001)Fujiko F. Fujio Masterpiece Theater Doraemon (Since April 2002)  (Since December 2006)Denjyarasu Jiisan Jya! (Since April 2010) (Since October 2011)Zo-Zo-Zo Zombie-kun (Since December 2012)Yōkai Watch (Since January 2013)Danball Senki Wars (Since April 2013)Puzzle & Dragons (Since September 2013)Danchi Tomoo 4-koma Park (Since September 2013)Punyu-punyu Warrior Myame-myame (Since October 2013)Pokémon X and Y: The Legend of the Pokémon Dragon King (Since November 2013)Hero Bank (Since November 2013)Gundam Build Fighters (Since November 2013)100% Pascal-sensei (Since January 2015)Splatoon (Since June 2016)

 Manga titles currently serialized in Bessatsu CoroCoro Comic Super Mario-kun (Since February 1991)Pokémon Pocket Monsters (Since February 1997)Denjyarasu Jiisan Jya! (Since June 2010)Duel Masters Victory (Since June 2011)Animal Crossing: New Leaf (Since October 2012)Lapis Lazuli (Since October 2012) (Since December 2012)Yo-Kai Watch (Since January 2013)Pokémon Torretta (Since February 2013)A Penguin's Troubles Plus (Since April 2013)Friendship Attached! Foot Burst (Since April 2013)Nyaemon (Since April 2013)Really!! Majime-kun! (Since June 2013)Super Conversion War Mojibakeru G Beat! (Since June 2013) Story of Duel Masters: Outrage (Since June 2013)Cosmos Stamp (Since August 2013) (Since October 2013)

 Manga titles currently serialized in CoroCoro Ichiban Super Refreshing TV Life: Oha Suta Boy (Since November 2005)Pokémon 4-koma Gag Picture book (Since November 2009)Detective Conan Special (Since May 2011)Super Mario-kun Theater (Since April 2013)Animal Crossing: New Leaf (Since July 2013)Yo-kai Watch Yoncoma Pun Club (Since April 2015)Secret Society Eagle Talon (Since January 2016)Chibi Kasu-kun (Since May 2016)Hoshi no Kirby Everything on Today's Diary (Since July 2016)Pokémon Special Sun•Moon Saga (Since January 2017)Pokémon TCG Sun•Moon Saga (Since January 2017)Star Kirby Puzzle Planet (Since January 2017)

Formerly serialized manga
This is a list of all manga that had been serialized by CoroCoro Comic at one point, but currently no longer.
1960sKaibutsu-kunDoraemon1970sGame Center Arashi1980sBikkurimanOyaji-chanDash! YonkuroGanbare, Kickers!Honō no Dōkyūji: Dodge DanpeiPerman1990sSaru Get YouCrash BandicootDonkey KongDuel MastersHonō no Tōkyūji: Dodge DanpeiKirby of the Stars: The Story of Dedede Who Lives in PupupuBakusō Kyōdai Let's & Go!!Ore wa Otoko da! Kunio-kun (manga based on the Kunio-kun series)Pokémon Blue (Japan)Spyro The DragonSuper B-DamanSpeed RacerSuper Mario-kunTamagotchiWataruZoids2000sDuel MastersBattle B-DamanBeybladeBomberman JettersCrash B-DamanCroket!DorabaseDenjyarasu Jiisan - Adapted into the anime Forza! HidemaruInazuma ElevenJak x Daxter ~Itachi de Waruika!!~Keshikasu-kunKiyohara-kunFF7ACRockman EXESolar Boy DjangoPokémon Diamond and PearlRatchet & Clank – Gagaga! Ginga no Gakeppuchi DensetsuShooting Star RockmanShippuu Tengoku Kaze no KlonoaSonic! Dash & SpinI'm Galileo!Kirby of the StarsPokémon PlatinumPokémon HeartGold and SoulSilverPokémon ColosseumSap-kunTamagotchiMysterious Joker2010sBaku Tech! BakuganCross Fight B-damanDanball SenkiDenjyarasu Jiisan Jya!Future Card BuddyfightHero BankInazuma Eleven: Ares no TenbinMetal Fight Beyblade ExplosionMetal Fight Beyblade 4DMetal Fight Beyblade Zero-GPokémon Black and WhitePokémon Black and White 2Pokémon X and YKamiwaza WandaSplatoonMinionsRich Police Cash!2020sDoraemonSchau LofHagemaru RebootMakycu N-ZochZip ZapPokémonBlack ChannelCirculation

Rivals
Corocoro has had many rival magazines in the past, with one of them, Comic Bom Bom, closing down due to declining sales. The current competition includes V Jump and Saikyo Jump.

Past rivals (January 1979–February 1982) (January 1981–January 1983)Comic Bom Bom (November 1981–December 2007) (November 1985–January 1989) (January 2004–October 2009)Kerokero Ace (December 2007–September 2013)

Current rivalsV Jump (since June 1993)Monthly Shōnen Ace (since December 1994)Saikyō Jump (since January 2012)

Foreign adaptationsCO-CO! (Hong Kong)
CoroCoro Monthly (Taiwan)
Dragon Comic CORO-CORO (China)

See alsoWeekly Shōnen Sunday''

References

External links
Official site 
 
 
Bessatsu CoroCoro Comic Minisite 
CoroCoro Ichiban Minisite 
CoroCoro Archive 

CoroCoro Comic
1977 establishments in Japan
Monthly manga magazines published in Japan
Magazines established in 1977
Shogakukan magazines
Kodomo manga magazines
Magazines published in Tokyo